Endangered Species is the third and final solo studio album by American rapper Big Hawk from Houston, Texas. It was released posthumously, on May 15, 2007 through Ghetto Dreams Entertainment. It features guest appearances from Big Pokey, Chamillionaire, Chris Ward, C-Note, Devin the Dude, E. Martin, Fat Pat, Jimmy D of 713, Lil' Keke, Lil' O, Mike D, Paul Wall, Scooby of Grit Boys, Slim Thug, Trae tha Truth & Wayne "PZ" Perry.

Track listing

Charts

References

2007 albums
Big Hawk albums
Albums published posthumously